Mary Ireland Farnsworth (1830–1923) was the wife of former Governor of West Virginia Daniel D. T. Farnsworth and served as that state's First Lady, 1869.  She was born on May 1, 1830, at Upshur County, West Virginia, a niece of Confederate General Thomas "Stonewall" Jackson. She holds the distinction of serving only five days as first lady; her husband completed the unexpired term of Arthur I. Boreman, who had resigned to enter the United States Senate. After leaving office, the Farnsworths moved to Buckhannon, West Virginia.  She died on February 22, 1923.

References

1830 births
1923 deaths
People from Upshur County, West Virginia
First Ladies and Gentlemen of West Virginia
People from Buckhannon, West Virginia